The Odes are a collection in four books of Latin lyric poems by Horace. The Horatian ode format and style has been emulated since by other poets. Books 1 to 3 were published in 23 BC. A fourth book, consisting of 15 poems, was published in 13 BC.

The Odes were developed as a conscious imitation of the short lyric poetry of Greek originals – Pindar, Sappho and Alcaeus are some of Horace's models. His genius lay in applying these older forms to the social life of Rome in the age of Augustus. The Odes cover a range of subjects – love, friendship, wine, religion, morality, patriotism; poems of eulogy addressed to Augustus and his relations; and verses written on a miscellany of subjects and incidents, including the uncertainty of life, the cultivation of tranquility and contentment, and the observance of moderation or the "golden mean."

The Odes have been considered traditionally by English-speaking scholars as purely literary works. Recent evidence by a Horatian scholar suggests they may have been intended as performance art, a Latin re-interpretation of Greek lyric song. The Roman writer Petronius, writing less than a century after Horace's death, remarked on the curiosa felicitas (studied spontaneity) of the Odes (Satyricon 118). The English poet Alfred Tennyson declared that the Odes provided "jewels five-words long, that on the stretched forefinger of all Time / Sparkle for ever" (The Princess, part II, l.355).

Book 1
Book 1 consists of 38 poems. The phrase Nunc est bibendum, "Now is the time to drink!", is the opening of I.37.

I.1,  Maecenas atavis edite regibus... – Dedication of the First Three Books of the Odes to Maecenas (Horace's Patron) –
Every man is governed by his ruling passion: the Olympian charioteer, the politician, the trader, the husbandman, the merchant, the man of pleasure, the soldier, and the hunter. To win the title of a lyric poet is all that Horace desires.

I.2, Iam satis terris nivis atque dirae... – To Augustus, The Deliverer and Hope of the State –
The subject of this ode is the overflowing of the Tiber, which recalls to the poet the flood of Deucalion. He imagines that the disaster is caused by the wrath of Ilia (the wife of Tiber), the civil wars, and the assassination of Julius Caesar. Augustus, as Mercury in human shape, is invoked to save the empire.

I.3, Sic te diva potens Cypri.. – To Virgil, Setting Out for Greece –
The ode begins with a prayer for the safe voyage of Virgil to Athens, which suggests the daring of the earliest mariners and the boldness of men in overcoming difficulties set by Nature.

I.4, Solvitur acris hiems... – A Hymn to Springtime –
The changing season warns us of the shortness of life. 
Horace urges his friend Sestius – vitae summa brevis spem nos vetat incohare longam (The brief sum of life forbids us cling to far-off hope).

I.5, Quis multa gracilis te puer in rosa... – To the Flirt Pyrrha, who is as faithless as the winds or seas, and whose fancy no lover can hold onto.

I.6, Scriberis Vario fortis et hostium victor... – Horace pleads his inability to worthily sing the praises of M. Vipsanius Agrippa, the distinguished Roman Commander.

I.7, Laudabunt alii claram Rhodon aut Mytilenen... – Fairest of Spots, O Plancus, is Tibur – There, or wherever you may be, drown your cares in wine.

I.8, Lydia, dic, per omnis te deos oro... –  To Lydia, who has transformed Sybaris from a hardy athlete into a doting lover.

I.9, Vides ut alta stet nive candidum... – Winter Without Bids Us Make Merry Within –
(with borrowing from an original by Alcaeus) – To Thaliarchus. The snow is deep and the frost is keen – Pile high the hearth and bring out old wine – Leave all else to the gods.

I.10, Mercuri, facunde nepos Atlantis... – Hymn to Mercury –
Mercury is addressed as the god of eloquence and the promoter of the civilization of man; as the messenger of the gods and the inventor of the lyre; skilled in craft and cunning; and the conductor of souls to the Underworld.

I.11, Tu ne quaesieris... – Carpe Diem! –
The poet seeks to dissuade Leuconoe from giving heed to the false arts of astrologers and diviners. It is vain to inquire into the future – Let us enjoy the present, for this is all we can command. It closes with the famous line: carpe diem, quam minimum credula postero (Seize the day, trusting tomorrow as little as possible).

I.12, Quem virum aut heroa lyra... – The Praises of Augustus –
The poet praises Augustus by associating him with gods and heroes, and distinguished Romans of earlier days.

I.13, Cum tu, Lydia... – Jealousy –
Addressed to Lydia – The poet contrasts the misery of jealousy with the happiness secured by constancy in love.

I.14, O navis, referent in mare te novi fluctus... – The Ship of State –
Horace refers to a period during which the Roman state was tossed and nearly wrecked by perpetual storms. He exhorts it to beware of fresh perils and keep safely in harbor.

I.15, Pastor cum traheret... – The Prophecy of Nereus –
As Paris hurries from Sparta to Troy with Helen, Nereus stills the winds and prophesies – Ilium's doom is inevitable.

I.16, O matre pulchra filia pulchrior... – An Apology –
The poet has offended some lady by the intemperate utterances of his verse; he now seeks forgiveness for the fault. He describes the sad effects of unbridled anger, and urges her to restrain hers.

I.17, Velox amoenum saepe Lucretilem... – An Invitation to Tyndaris to Enjoy the Delights of the Country –
Horace invites Tyndaris to his Sabine farm, and describes the air of tranquility and security there, blessed as it is with favoring protection of Faunus and the rural deities.

I.18, Nullam, Vare, sacra vite prius seueris arborem... – The Praise of Wine, and the ill effects of intemperance.

I.19, Mater saeua Cupidinum... – The Poet's Love for Glycera

I.20, Vile potabis modicis Sabinum cantharis... – An Invitation to Maecenas –
You will drink poor Sabine wine in modest bowls when you visit the poet.

I.21, Dianam tenerae dicite virgines... – Hymn in Praise of Latona and Her Children, Diana and Apollo

I.22, Integer vitae scelerisque purus... – Upright of Life and Free from Wickedness –
Addressed to Aristius Fuscus – Begins as a solemn praise of honest living and ends in a mock-heroic song of love for sweetly laughing "Lalage" (cf. II.5.16, Propertius IV.7.45).

I.23, Vitas hinnuleo me similis, Chloë... – Fear Me Not, Chloe, and do not shun me.

I.24, Quis desiderio sit pudor aut modus... – To Virgil –  A Lament for the Death of Quinctilius

I.25, Parcius iunctas quatiunt fenestras... – Lydia, Thy Charms Are Past –
Horace taunts Lydia with her approaching old age and her lack of admirers.

I.26, Musis amicus tristitiam et metus tradam... – In Praise of Aelius Lamia –
The poet bids the Muses to inspire him to sing the praises of Aelius Lamia, a man distinguished for his exploits in war.

I.27, Natis in usum laetitiae scyphis... – Let Moderation Reign –
At a wine party, Horace endeavors to restrain his quarrelsome companions – He asks the brother of Megilla of Opus to confide the object of his affections.

I.28, Te maris et terrae numeroque... – Death, The Doom of All –
Dialogue, between a sailor and the spirit of the philosopher Archytas, on Death, the universal fate, and the duty of giving to the dead the rites of burial.

I.29, Icci, beatis nunc Arabum invides... – The Scholar Turned Adventurer –
A remonstrance addressed to Iccius on his intention of giving up philosophy and of joining the expedition to Arabia Felix.

I.30, O Venus regina Cnidi Paphique... – A Prayer to Venus –
Venus is invoked to abandon for a while her beloved Cyprus, and to honor with her presence the temple prepared for her at the home of Glycera.

I.31, Quid dedicatum poscit Apollinem vates?... – Prayer to Apollo on the consecration of his temple.

I.32, Poscimus, si quid vacui sub umbra... – Invocation to the Lyre –
The poet addresses his lyre, and blends with the address the praises of the Greek poet Alcaeus.

I.33, Albi, ne doleas plus nimio memor... – The Faithless Glycera –
A consolation to the contemporary poet Tibullus over a lost love.

I.34, Parcus deorum cultor et infrequens... – The Poet's Conversion from Error –
After hearing thunder in a cloudless sky, Horace renounces his former error and declares his belief in Jupiter, Fortuna, and the superintending providence of the gods.

I.35, O diva, gratum quae regis Antium... – Hymn to Fortuna –
The poet invokes Fortune as an all-powerful goddess. He implores her to preserve Augustus in his distant expeditions, and to save the state from ruinous civil wars.

I.36, Et ture et fidibus iuvat – An Ode of Congratulation to Plotius Numida, on his safe return from Spain, where he had been serving under Augustus in a war against the Cantabrians.

I.37, Nunc est bibendum... – Now Is the Time to Drink! –
An ode of joy for Augustus's victory at Actium, the capture of Alexandria, and the death of Cleopatra. The tone of triumph over the fallen queen is tempered by a tribute of admiration to her lofty pride and resolute courage.

I.38, Persicos odi, puer, apparatus... – Away With Oriental Luxury! –
Horace directs his attendant to make the simplest preparations for his entertainment.

Book 2
Book 2 consists of 20 poems.

II.1, Motum ex Metello consule civicum... – To Asinius Pollio, the writer of tragedy, who is now composing a history of the civil wars. A lament for the carnage caused by the conflicts of the Romans with their fellow-citizens.

II.2, Nullus argento color est avaris... – The Wise Use of Money –
To Sallustius Crispus (nephew of the historian Sallust). The love of gain grows by self-indulgence. The moderate man is the genuine king.

II.3, Aequam memento rebus in arduis... – The Wisdom of Moderation, The Certainty of Death –
To Quintus Dellius. Let us enjoy our life while we may, for death will soon strip us all alike of our possessions.

II.4, Ne sit ancillae tibi amor pudori... – To Xanthias Phoceus – Horace encourages his friend on his love for Phyllis, his slave.

II.5, Nondum subacta ferre iugum valet... – Not Yet! –
To a Friend on His Love for Lalage – The maid his friend loves is not yet marriageable and still too young to return his passion – Soon it will be otherwise.

II.6, Septimi, Gadis aditure mecum et... – Fairest of All is Tibur – Yet Tarentum, Too, Is Fair –
To Horace's friend, the Roman knight Septimius, who would go with him to the ends of the earth. The poet prays that Tibur may be the resting-place of his old age; or, if that may not be, he will choose the country which lies around Tarentum.

II.7, O saepe mecum tempus in ultimum... – A Joyful Return –
An ode of congratulation to Pompeius Varus, once the poet's comrade in the army of Brutus, on his restoration to civil rights.

II.8, Ulla si iuris tibi peierati... – The Baleful Charms of Barine –
On Barine's utter faithlessness, which Heaven will not punish – Indeed, her beauty and fascination are ever-increasing.

II.9, Non semper imbres nubibus hispidos... – A Truce to Sorrow, Valgius! –
To C. Valgius Rufus on the death of his son Mystes. Since all troubles have their natural end, do not mourn overmuch. Rather let us celebrate the latest victories of Augustus.

II.10, Rectius vives, Licini, neque altum... – The Golden Mean –
To L. Licinius Murena. The moderate life is the perfect life.

II.11, Quid bellicosus Cantaber et Scythes... – Enjoy Life Wisely! –
Horace in a half-playful tone advises his friend Quinctius Hirpinus to enjoy life wisely, and not to fret.

II.12, Nolis longa ferae bella Numantiae... – The Charms of Licymnia –
Horace pleads the unfitness of his lyric poetry to record the wars of the Romans or the battles of mythology. He advises Maecenas to write in prose the history of Caesar's campaigns, while he himself will sing the praises of Licymnia (some commentators say that Licymnia was another name for Terentia, the wife of Maecenas).

II.13, Ille et nefasto te posuit die... – A Narrow Escape –
This ode owes its origin to Horace's narrow escape from sudden death by the falling of a tree on his Sabine estate. (This same event is also alluded to in Odes, II.17 line 28 and III.4 line 27.) After expressing his indignation against the person who planted the tree, he passes to a general reflection on the uncertainty of life and the realms of dark Proserpine.

II.14, Eheu fugaces, Postume... – Death Inevitable –
Addressed to Postumus, a rich but avaricious friend. Nothing can stay the advance of decay and death, the common doom of all on earth. Men pile up wealth, only for another to waste it.

II.15, Iam pauca aratro iugera regiae... – Against Luxury –
Horace describes the extravagant luxury prevalent among the rich, and praises the simplicity and frugality of the old Romans.

II.16, Otium divos rogat in patenti... – Contentment With Our Lot the Only True Happiness –
All men long for repose, which riches cannot buy. Contentment, not wealth, makes genuine happiness.

II.17, Cur me querellis exanimas tuis?... – To Maecenas on His Recovery from Illness –
Horace says that the same day must of necessity bring death to them both – Their horoscopes are wonderfully alike and they have both been saved from extreme peril.

II.18, Non ebur neque aureum... – The Vanity of Riches –
The poet, content with his own moderate fortune, inveighs against the blindness of avarice – for the same end awaits all men.

II.19, Bacchum in remotis carmina rupibus... – Hymn to Bacchus –
The poet celebrates Bacchus as all-powerful, all-conquering, and lord of creation; whom the earth, the sea and all nature obey; to whom men are subject, and the giants and the monsters of Orcus are all brought low.

II.20, Non usitata nec tenui ferar... – The Poet Prophesies His Own Immortality –
Transformed into a swan, the poet will soar away from the abodes of men, nor will he need the empty honors of a tomb.

Book 3

The ancient editor Porphyrion read the first six odes of this book as a single sequence, one unified by a common moral purpose and addressed to all patriotic citizens of Rome.  These six "Roman odes", as they have since been called (by HT Plüss in 1882), share a common meter and take as a common theme the glorification of Roman virtues and the attendant glory of Rome under Augustus.  Ode III.2 contains the famous line "Dulce et decorum est pro patria mori," (It is sweet and honorable to die for one's country). Ode III.5 Caelo tonantem credidimus Jovem makes explicit identification of Augustus as a new Jove destined to restore in modern Rome the valor of past Roman heroes like Marcus Atilius Regulus, whose story occupies the second half of the poem.

Book 3 consists of 30 poems.

III.1, Odi profanum vulgus et arceo... – On Happiness –
Philosophy is a mystery which the uninitiated crowd cannot understand. The worthlessness of riches and rank. The praise of contentment. Care cannot be banished by change of scene.

III.2, Angustam amice pauperiem pati... – On Virtue –
Horace extols the virtue of endurance and valor in fighting for one's country, of integrity in politics, and of religious honor.

III.3, Iustum et tenacem propositi virum... – On Integrity and Perseverance –
The merit of integrity and resolution: the examples of Pollux, Hercules and Romulus. Juno's speech to the gods on the destiny of Rome.

III.4, Descende caelo et dic age tibia... – On Wise Counsel and Clemency –
The Muses have guarded and given counsel to Horace since his youth. They also do so to Augustus, and prompt him to clemency and kindness. The evils of violence and arrogance, on the other hand, are exemplified by the Titans and Giants, and others.

III.5, Caelo tonantem credidimus Iovem... – To Augustus – On Virtue and Fortitude –
Augustus will be recognized as a god on earth for his subjugation of the Britons and Parthians. The disgraceful actions of the troops of Crassus (who married Parthians after being taken prisoner) are contrasted by the noble example of Regulus (who was released from Carthage to negotiate a peace, but dissuaded the Senate, and then returned to Carthage to be tortured to death).

III.6, Delicta maiorum inmeritus lues... – Piety & Chastity – Return to the Old Morals! –
Horace condemns the prevailing domestic immorality and contempt of the institutions of religion, and earnestly urges a speedy return to the simpler and purer manners of ancient times.

III.7, Quid fles, Asterie, quem tibi candidi... – Constancy, Asterie! –
Horace consoles Asterie on the absence of her lover Gyges, and warns her not to be unfaithful to her own vows.

III.8, Martis caelebs quid agam Kalendis... – A Happy Anniversary –
Horace invites Maecenas to celebrate with him the festival of the Calends of March (the Feast of the Matrons), which was also the anniversary of his narrow escape from sudden death by a falling tree.

III.9, Donec gratus eram tibi... – The Reconciliation of Two Lovers –
Often referred to as an "Amoebaean" ode (from the Greek αμείβω – to exchange), it describes, in graceful dialogue, a quarrel between two lovers and their reconciliation.

III.10, Extremum Tanain si biberes, Lyce... – A Lover's Complaint –
Horace warns Lyce that he cannot put up with her unkindness forever.

III.11, Mercuri, – nam te docilis magistro... – Take Warning, Lyde, from the Danaids! –
To Mercury – Horace begs the god to teach him such melody as will overcome the unkindness of Lyde. The ode concludes with the tale of the daughters of Danaus, and their doom in the underworld.

III.12, Miserarum est neque amori dare ludum... – Unhappy Neobule –
Joyless is the life of Neobule, ever under the watchful eye of a strict guardian. Only thoughts of handsome Hebrus take her mind off her troubles.

III.13, O fons Bandusiae splendidior vitro... – O, Fountain of Bandusia! –
Tomorrow a sacrifice will be offered to the fountain of Bandusia, whose refreshing coolness is offered to the flocks and herds, and which is now immortalized in verse.

III.14, Herculis ritu modo dictus, o plebs... – The Return of Augustus –
Horace proclaims a festal day on the return of Augustus from Spain (c. 24 BC), where he had reduced to subjection the fierce Cantabri.

III.15, Uxor pauperis Ibyci... – Chloris, Act Your Age! –
Horace taunts Chloris with her attempts to appear young, and with her frivolous life, while she is really an old woman.

III.16, Inclusam Danaen turris aenea... – Contentment is Genuine Wealth –
Gold is all-powerful, but its possession brings care and restlessness. True contentment is to be satisfied with little, as Horace is with his Sabine farm.

III.17, Aeli vetusto nobilis ab Lamo... – Prepare for Storms Tomorrow –
To Aelius Lamia – The crow foretells a stormy day tomorrow – Gather some firewood while you may, and spend the day in festivity.

III.18, Faune, Nympharum fugientum amator... – Hymn to Faunus –
Horace asks Faunus to bless his flocks and fields, for when Faunus is near, the whole countryside is glad.

III.19, Quantum distet ab Inacho... – Invitation to a Banquet –
Horace invites Telephus to give up for a time his historical researches, and join him at a banquet in honor of Murena.

III.20, Non vides quanto moveas periclo... – The Rivals –
Horace humorously describes a contest between Pyrrhus and some maiden for the exclusive regards of Nearchus.

III.21, O nata mecum consule Manlio... – To a Wine-Jar –
Horace, preparing to entertain his friend the orator M. Valerius Messala Corvinus, sings of the manifold virtues of wine.

III.22, Montium custos nemorumque virgo – To Diana –
Horace dedicates a pine tree to Diana, and vows to the goddess a yearly sacrifice.

III.23, Caelo supinas si tuleris manus – Humble Sacrifices Devoutly Offered –
Horace assures the rustic Phidyle that the favor of the gods is gained not by costly offerings, but simple sacrifices such as salted meal offered with true feeling.

III.24, Intactis opulentior... – The Curse of Mammon –
Boundless riches cannot banish fear or avert death. A simple life like that of the Scythians is the healthiest and best. Stringent laws are needed to curb the present luxury and licentiousness.

III.25, Quo me, Bacche, rapis tui... – To Bacchus in Honor of Augustus –
Horace fancies himself carried along by Bacchus amid woods and wilds to celebrate, in some distant cave, the praises of Augustus.

III.26, Vixi puellis nuper idoneus... – Love's Triumphs Are Ended –
Scorned by the haughty Chloe, the poet, like a discharged soldier, abandons the arms of love. But he begs of Venus, as a last request, that his slighted love may not go unavenged.

III.27, Impios parrae recinentis omen... – Galatea, Beware! –
Addressed to Galatea, whom the poet seeks to dissuade from the voyage she intended to make during the stormy season of the year. He bids her to beware, lest the mild aspect of the deceitful skies lead her astray – for it was through lack of caution that Europa was carried away across the sea.

III.28, Festo quid potius die... – In Neptune's Honor –
An invitation to Lyde to visit the poet on the festival of Neptune, and join him in wine and song.

III.29, Tyrrhena regum progenies, tibi... – Invitation to Maecenas –
Horace invites Maecenas to leave the smoke and wealth and bustle of Rome, and come to visit him on his Sabine farm. He bids him to remember that we must live wisely and well in the present, as the future is uncertain.

III.30, Exegi monumentum aere perennius... – The Poet's Immortal Fame –
In this closing poem, Horace confidently predicts his enduring fame as the first and greatest of the lyric poets of Rome. He asserts: Exegi monumentum aere perennius (I have raised a monument more permanent than bronze).

Book 4
Horace published a fourth book of Odes in 13 BC consisting of 15 poems.  Horace acknowledged the gap in time with the first words of the opening poem of the collection:  Intermissa, Venus, diu / rursus bella moves (Venus, you return to battles long interrupted).

IV.1, Intermissa, Venus, diu... – Venus, Forbear! –
Horace complains that in advancing age he is vexed with new desires by the cruel goddess of love: he pines for Ligurinus. He bids her to turn to a more youthful and worthy subject, his friend Paulus Maximus.

IV.2, Pindarum quisquis studet aemulari... – Not for Me to Sing of Augustus! –
Horace was asked by Iulus Antonius (the son of Marc Antony and stepson of Augustus' sister Octavia) to sing of Augustus' victories in a Pindaric ode. Horace declines, alleging lack of talent, and requests Iulus to compose the poem himself.

IV.3, Quem tu, Melpomene, semel... – To Melpomene, Muse of Lyric Poetry –
To the Muse Melpomene Horace ascribes his poetic inspiration and the honors which he enjoys as the lyric poet of Rome.

IV.4, Qualem ministrum fulminis alitem... – In Praise of Drusus, the Younger Stepson of Augustus –
(A companion to Ode IV.14, which praises Tiberius). This ode praises Drusus, the younger son of the Empress Livia, on his victory over the Raeti and Vindelici. Drusus is compared to a young eagle and lion. His stepfather Augustus is also praised as having trained him to greatness.

IV.5, Divis orte bonis, optume Romulae... – Augustus, Return! –
Horace begs Augustus to return to Rome, and describes the peace and good order of the principate under his reign.

IV.6, Dive, quem proles Niobea magnae... – Invocation to Apollo –
In the year 17 BC, Augustus commissioned Horace to write the Carmen Saeculare, a hymn to be sung at the Saecular festival. This ode is an invocation to Apollo, begging help and inspiration for this important task.

IV.7, Diffugere nives, redeunt iam... – The Lesson of Spring's Return –
An ode on the same springtime theme as I.4 – Addressed to his friend Torquatus. Though the earth renews itself, and the waning moon waxes afresh, yet death is the ending of human life. Let us then make the best of our days while they last.

IV.8, Donarem pateras grataque commodus... – In Praise of Poetry –
This ode was written to C. Marcius Censorinus and probably sent as a Saturnalian gift. Horace would give bronze vases, or tripods, or gems of Grecian art, but he does not have these. What he has to give instead is the immortality of a poem.

IV.9, Ne forte credas interitura quae... – In Praise of Lollius –
As in IV.8, Horace promises immortality through his verses, this time to Lollius, a man of wisdom and integrity.

IV.10, O crudelis adhuc et Veneris... – Beauty Is Fleeting –
An ode to a beautiful boy, Ligurinus, and the inevitability of old age.

IV.11, Est mihi nonum superantis annum... – A Joyous Birthday –
An invitation to Phyllis to celebrate the birthday of Maecenas at Horace's Sabine farm.

IV.12, Iam veris comites... – The Delights of Spring –
Addressed to Virgil (although not necessarily the poet). The breezes and birds have returned – An invitation to a feast of Spring – The poet agrees to supply the wine, if Virgil will bring a box of perfumes.

IV.13, Audivere, Lyce, di mea vota... – Retribution –
Horace taunts Lyce, now growing old, on her desperate attempts to seem young and fascinating.

IV.14, Quae cura patrum quaeve Quiritium... – In Praise of Tiberius, the Elder Stepson of Augustus –
(A companion to Ode IV.4, which praises Drusus.) Horace honors the courage and exploits of Tiberius, the elder son of the empress Livia, on his victories over the tribes of the Raetian Alps. He then praises Augustus, whom he extols as the glory of the war, the defense of Roman and Italy, and as the undisputed ruler of the world.

IV.15, Phoebus volentem proelia me loqui... – The Praises of Augustus –
Horace records in song the victories of Augustus – Peace, good order, the establishment of public morals, the extended glory of the Roman name abroad, and security and happiness at home.

See also
Prosody (Latin)

References

External links

 Odes in English at the Perseus Project
 Works of Horace in Latin at The Latin Library
 
 Carmina Horatiana All Carmina of Horace recited in Latin by Thomas Bervoets (mp3).

1st-century BC Latin books
Poetry by Horace